Bonnières is a commune in the Pas-de-Calais department in the Hauts-de-France region in northern France. On 1 January 2019, the former commune Canteleux was merged into Bonnières.

Geography
A farming village located 26 miles (41 km) west of Arras at the junction of the D115 and D114 roads.

History
During World War II, Bonnières was subjected to heavy Allied bombing, as the Germans had built a launch site for their V1 rockets within the commune. The village was badly damaged, but not one missile was ever launched successfully

Population

Sights
 The church of St. Aubin, rebuilt in 1960 after the destruction of the village during World War II.

See also
Communes of the Pas-de-Calais department

References

Communes of Pas-de-Calais

Communes nouvelles of Pas-de-Calais